Åke Gerhard Ekstrand (28 December 1846 in Gränna – 9 April 1933), was a Swedish chemist and public servant.

Ekstrand became a student in Uppsala in 1865, Bachelor of Arts in 1872, Docent in chemistry at Uppsala University in 1875 and the same year Doctor of Philosophy (Primus).  As Byzantine scholar he studied chemistry 1877–1878 at the University of Zurich and the University of Munich.  He was 1879-1889 the commercial chemist in Uppsala, was appointed in 1889 as a teacher at Chalmers educational institution in Gothenburg and was with beginning in 1890 the Technical Officer at the Ministry of Finance control and adjustment bureau, chief engineer 1907–1909 in the Inspection and Adjustment Board, and 1909–1913 in the Control Board.

Sources 

Swedish chemists
Swedish civil servants
Academic staff of the Chalmers University of Technology
Uppsala University alumni
Members of the Royal Swedish Academy of Sciences
1846 births
1933 deaths